Armodoris is a genus of sea slugs, dorid nudibranchs, shell-less marine gastropod mollusks in the family Akiodorididae.

Species 
 Armodoris antarctica Minichev, 1972
 Armodoris anudeorum Valdés, Moran & Woods, 2011

References

Akiodorididae